Living Alone is an EP by musician Teddy Geiger. It was released on November 2, 2010.

Track listing
All songs written by Teddy Geiger.
 "Lie Tonight (WE USed TWO)" - 2:40
 "What Kind of Love" - 3:42
 "Give It Up" - 3:24
 "Sit and Wonder" - 3:47
 "Living Alone"  – 3:09
 "Drink It In" - 3:32

References

Teddy Geiger albums
2010 EPs